Xiao Lin may refer to:

Xiao Lin (actor) (1956–2015) (笑林), Chinese xiangsheng actor
Xiao Lin (athlete) (born 1978), Chinese track and field athlete